The Ahern Ministry was a ministry of the Australian Government of Queensland and was led by National Party Premier Mike Ahern and Deputy Premier Bill Gunn. It succeeded the Bjelke-Petersen Ministry on 1 December 1987 following Joh Bjelke-Petersen's resignation as Premier and from Parliament, and was in turn succeeded by the Cooper Ministry on 25 September 1989, led by Russell Cooper.

As the National Party was not in coalition at the time, all listed members are from that party.

Two-man ministry 
Due to the speed of the unusual events leading to the demise of the previous ministry, the initial Ahern Ministry consisted simply of Ahern and Gunn sharing all of the portfolios until a full Cabinet could be appointed and details of all other administrative arrangements could be finalised. It was sworn in by Governor Walter Campbell on 1 December 1987. The appointments of all previous ministers were terminated.

Full ministry 

A full ministry was sworn in on 9 December 1987. The Ministry largely reflected the membership and order of the Bjelke-Petersen Ministry prior to 25 November 1987, but Russ Hinze, Don Lane, Lin Powell (who had been elected Speaker on 2 December) and Yvonne Chapman were not re-appointed. Five new ministers were appointed to fill the vacancies.

On 19 January 1989, Ahern reshuffled the ministry, removing Leisha Harvey and appointing Craig Sherrin to replace her.

In August 1989, Russell Cooper nominated to replace Ahern at a party-room meeting, with Paul Clauson as his deputy. The bid failed, and both ministers and Bob Katter resigned on 29 August. On 31 August, a reshuffle took place and three new ministers were appointed. This final version of the ministry lasted until a second attempt by Cooper to gain the leadership was successful on 25 September.

References

 

Queensland ministries